Free Download Manager is a download manager for Windows, macOS, Linux and Android.

Free Download Manager is proprietary software, but was free and open-source software between versions 2.5 and 3.9.7. Starting with version 3.0.852 (15 April 2010), the source code was made available in the project's Subversion repository instead of being included with the binary package. This continued until versions 3.9.7. The source code for version 5.0 and newer is not available and the GNU General Public License agreement has been removed from the app.

The ability to download YouTube videos was included in the program's functionality until October 16th, 2021, when one of the developers, Alex, indicated that Google had filed a complaint report, requesting the option be disabled. Attempts to download any videos from YouTube currently result in the message, "Youtube downloads are not available" being shown in the download box. A resolution with Google's legal team still has yet to be reached.

Features
 The GUI presents several tabs that organize types of downloads and allow access to different features in the program.
 Download information view that shows each download's progress bar, file preview, community opinions if any are written for that download and a log showing connection status.
Download acceleration
 Dropbox for file drag-and-drop
 HTTP and FTP download support
Enhanced audio/video files support
 RTSP/MMS download support
 Batch downloading support for downloading a set of files
 Segmented file transfer: Splits large file into parts (specified in the settings of the software) and downloads simultaneously 
 BitTorrent support (based on Libtorrent), Magnet URI scheme support
 Flash video download from sites like Google Video (exclude Android)
 Resuming broken downloads, if permitted by server
 Zip files partial download, lets users to download only the necessary part of a zip file.
 Simultaneous downloading from several mirrors
 Support bandwidth throttling via three fully customizable traffic modes: light, medium and heavy.
 Import list of URLs from clipboard
 Integrates with the browser being used to track URL or Copy functions if downloadable content is found
 Remote control via Internet
Smart file management and powerful scheduler
Portable mode, users can easily create its portable version and avoid the need to install and configure the program on each computer.
Active Spyware and Adware protection using active communication among users and also through installed Antivirus software on the computer.

Tabs
 Downloads – This is the focal point of the program, which is simply a download manager. Users can also create groups with folders to which files with specific extensions will be downloaded.
 Flash video downloads – This feature helps users to download FLV video files from Google Video and many other sites.
 Torrents – Allows to download the torrent files
 Scheduler – Users can create and manage lists of tasks to be executed at a preset time. Tasks include launching external programs, starting and stopping downloads, and shutting down the computer in all possible ways.
 Site Explorer – This feature is an FTP client.
 Site Manager – This feature allows users to tell FDM how to act with specific sites, such as websites that require authentication, or how many download connections a website can accept simultaneously from the user.
 HTML Spider – This feature can download a website by following and downloading links recursively.

See also
 BitTorrent client
 Comparison of file sharing applications
 Comparison of download managers
 Comparison of YouTube downloaders

References

External links

 
 
 Free Download Manager Review

BitTorrent clients for Linux
Android (operating system) software
2004 software
Download managers
Free BitTorrent clients
Free software programmed in C++
Windows Internet software
macOS software
Freeware
Proprietary software
Portable software
Formerly free software
BitTorrent clients
GNU Project software